Streblosa is a genus of flowering plants belonging to the family Rubiaceae.

Its native range is Thailand to Malesia.

Species
Species:

Streblosa anambasica 
Streblosa assimilis 
Streblosa axilliflora 
Streblosa bracteata 
Streblosa bracteolata 
Streblosa bullata 
Streblosa chlamydantha 
Streblosa deliensis 
Streblosa glabrata 
Streblosa hypomalaca 
Streblosa johannis-winkleri 
Streblosa lampongensis 
Streblosa lanceolata 
Streblosa leiophylla 
Streblosa longiscapa 
Streblosa maxima 
Streblosa microcarpa 
Streblosa multiglandulosa 
Streblosa myriocarpa 
Streblosa palawanensis 
Streblosa polyantha 
Streblosa scabridula 
Streblosa tortilis 
Streblosa undulata 
Streblosa urticina

References

Rubiaceae
Rubiaceae genera